Mississippi Nights was a music club in St. Louis, Missouri.  It opened on October 11, 1976 and was located at 914 N 1st Street, on the western bank of the Mississippi River, four blocks north of the Gateway Arch in Laclede's Landing.

Concerts at the venue, which held up to 1,000 people, were often "all ages" events, with just over one percent restricted to patrons 21 and over.

The club is the subject of a song on the album Venue Songs by They Might Be Giants. George Thorogood & the Destroyers' album Live: Let's Work Together features tracks recorded at Mississippi Nights.

Closure
In early 2003, rumors began circulating that the club would close to make way for Lumière Place, a new casino development.  The rumors were confirmed in early 2007, and the last show was held on January 19, 2007.

The last band to play on its stage was The Urge fronted by a band member from Mudworm, which also played.  The Urge sold out 93 of 100 shows at Mississippi Nights.

References

External links 

Nightclubs in the United States
Music venues in St. Louis
Former music venues in the United States